The Fife Cup is a Scottish regional football competition for clubs in the historic county of Fife. The competition was founded by the Fifeshire Football Association in 1882. The competition was originally known as the "Fifeshire Cup" from 1882–1896 and the "Fife and District Cup" between 1896 and 1900. It also run on league lines between 1903 and 1905 called the "Fifeshire League" before its current name.

The current holders are Dunfermline Athletic who won the 2018 –19 competition.

Participants
For the 2022–23 season, nine clubs are taking part in the competition.

 Burntisland Shipyard 
 Cowdenbeath
 Dundonald Bluebell
 Dunfermline Athletic (holders)
 East Fife
 Hill of Beath Hawthorn
 Kelty Hearts
 Raith Rovers
 St Andrews United

Winners

Key

Results

References

Football in Fife
Football cup competitions in Scotland
Recurring sporting events established in 1882
1882 establishments in Scotland